Joachim Westphal (born at Hamburg 1510 or at the beginning of 1511; died there 16 January 1574) was a German "Gnesio-Lutheran" theologian and Protestant reformer.

From 1571 to 1574 he served as Superintendent of Hamburg (per pro already since 1562), presiding as spiritual leader over the Lutheran state church of the city-state.

He was educated in the school of the parish of St. Nicolai in his native city, then in Lüneburg, and entered the University of Wittenberg, where he became the pupil of Melanchthon and Luther. In 1532, on the recommendation of Melanchthon, he was appointed teacher at the Johanneum in his native city. In 1534 he returned to the University of Wittenberg, and in the following year removed with the university to Jena. After his return to Wittenberg in 1537 he lectured on philology. In 1541 he became preacher of the church of St. Catharine in Hamburg; then acting superintendent in 1562, and was elected Superintendent of Hamburg in 1571.

He is best known for his participation in the theological controversies of his time. He took part in that on the descent into hell, also in the discussion concerning the Leipzig Interim and in that over the Adiaphora. More important was that over the Lord's Supper. In 1552 he published Farrago confusanearum et inter se dissidentium opinionum de coena Domini, ex Sacramentariorum libris congesta, a warning against those who deny the presence of Christ in the Lord's Supper. He points out to the adherents of Luther the alarming progress which the sacramentarians had made and tries to prove the falsity of their doctrine by its diversity. In 1553 he issued Recta fides de coena Domini, an exegetical discussion of 1 Cor. 11 and the Words of Institution; in 1555 Collectanea sententiarum D. Aurelii Augustini de coena Domini and Fides Cyrilli episcopi Alexandriae de praesentia corporis et sanguinis Christi.

Calvin answered in January 1555, with his Defensio sanae et orthodoxae doctrinae de sacramentis. Thus there was opened a controversy which involved on the side of the Reformed Lasco, Bullinger, Ochino, Valerandus Polanus, Beza, and Bibliander; on the side of the Lutherans Timann, Paul von Eitzen, Schnepff, E. Alberus, Gallus, Flacius, Judex, Brenz, and Andreä. Westphal replied to Calvin in Adversus cuiusdam sacramentarii falsam criminationem iusta defensio, in qua et eucharistiae causa agitur (1555), to which Calvin answered in Secunda defensio piae et orthodoxae de sacramentis fidei (1556), which was an attempt to draw to his side the Philippists of Saxony and Lower Germany.

Other works of Westphal occasioned by this controversy are: Epistola Joachimi Westphali, qua breviter respondet ad convicia J. Calvini (1556); Confessio fidei de eucharistiae sacramento, in qua ministri ecclesiarum Saxoniae...astruunt corporis et sanguinis D. n. J. Christi praesentiam in coena sancta, et de libro Calvini ipsis dedicato respondent (Magdeburg, 1557); Justa defensio adversus insignia mendacia J. a Lasco, quae in epistola ad Poloniae regem contra Saxonicas ecclesias sparsit (1557); Apologetica scripta Johannis Westphali, quibus et sanam doctrinam de eucharistia defendit et foedissimas calumnias sacramentariorum diluit (1558); Confutatio aliquot enormium mendaciorum Johannis Calvini (1558); Apologia confessionis de Coena Domini (1558). This book contains a chapter "De adoratione Christi in Eucharistia", where he defends elevation and use of bell during consecration.

References

External links
The Calumnies of Joachim Westphal by John Calvin
The Eucharistic Controversies. Calvin and Westphal. History of the Christian Church, Volume VIII (CCEL)
Joachim Westphal in the Christian Cyclopedia

|-

1510s births
1574 deaths
Clergy from Hamburg
16th-century German Lutheran clergy
German Lutheran theologians
Lutheran Eucharistic theology
German male non-fiction writers
16th-century German Protestant theologians
16th-century German male writers
16th-century Lutheran theologians